Houard is a French surname. Notable people with the surname include:

 Clodomir Houard (1873–1943), French botanist and entomologist
 Marie-Claire Houard, Belgian civil servant

See also
 Howard

French-language surnames